Uto Peak is a mountain immediately north of Mount Sir Donald in the Selkirk Mountains of British Columbia, Canada. It was first climbed in 1890 by Emil Huber and Carl Sulzer.

The mountain is named for the Uto section of the Swiss Alpine Club, which counted Huber and Sulzer amongst its members. The Uto section is in turn named after a historic name for the Uetliberg mountain that overlooks the city of Zürich in Switzerland.

Climate

Based on the Köppen climate classification, the mountain has a subarctic climate with cold, snowy winters, and mild summers.

See also
List of mountains of Canada
Geography of British Columbia

References

External links
 Uto Peak at summitpost.org

Two-thousanders of British Columbia
Selkirk Mountains
Columbia Country
Glacier National Park (Canada)
Kootenay Land District